Movlud Miraliyev (born February 27, 1974 in Kitob, Qashqadaryo Province, Uzbekistan) is a retired Azerbaijani judoka of Turkish Meskhetian origin.

The Azerbaijani finished in joint fifth place in the half-heavyweight (100 kg) division at the 2004 Summer Olympics, having lost the bronze medal match to Michael Jurack of Germany. 
He won the Bronze Medal match against Przemysław Matyjaszek of Poland at the 2008 Summer Olympics.

2008 Olympic Games in Beijing
After the defeat at the Bronze Medal match against Michael Jurack of Germany at the 2004 Olympics in Athens, Miraliyev decides to return to the Olympics one more time. 
On the second match on mat 2 for the men under 100 kg, Miraliyev defeated Hassane Azzoun of Algeria by ippon. In the round of 16, the Azerbaijani fought against Levan Zhorzholiani of Georgia and won by Kata-gatame allowing him to step into the quarterfinals. 
In the quarterfinals, he came up against Daniel Brata of Romania and won by earning a wazari using the Kata Guruma. After that victory, he advances to the semifinal one step closer to the finals.
At the semifinals, it comes to him against Naidangiin Tüvshinbayar of Mongolia who defeated the top judokas such as Olympic champion Keiji Suzuki of Japan. Throughout the round, no points have been scored. During the golden score round, the Mongolian scored a yuko which ended the match. Nevertheless, Miraliyev has a chance of winning a medal though it's not gold or silver.
At the bronze medal match, it's the Azerbaijani judoka against Przemysław Matyjaszek of Poland. About 5 seconds before the time ran out, Miraliyev scored a wazari. At the end, Movlud Miraliyev won the Bronze Medal Match under -100 kg. He's the second judoka of Azerbaijan who won an Olympic medal after Elnur Mammadli.

Miraliyev retired from sports after the 2008 Olympics.

In 2016 he became the assistant of Zayzenbaher, head coach of Azerbaijani national judo team.

Achievements

References

External links
 
 

 Yahoo! Sports

1974 births
Living people
Azerbaijani people of Turkish descent 
Meskhetian Turkish people
Azerbaijani male judoka
Olympic judoka of Azerbaijan
Judoka at the 2004 Summer Olympics
Judoka at the 2008 Summer Olympics
Olympic bronze medalists for Azerbaijan
Olympic medalists in judo
Medalists at the 2008 Summer Olympics
Uzbekistani people of Azerbaijani descent